Wilmer Cleveland Wells (4 November 1839 – October 19, 1933) was a Canadian rancher, lumberman and political figure in British Columbia. He represented East Kootenay North from 1899 to 1903 and Columbia from 1903 to 1907 as a Liberal in the Legislative Assembly of British Columbia.

Wells was first elected to the assembly in an 1899 by-election held following the death of William George Nielson. He was named to the provincial cabinet in 1902 as Commissioner of Lands and Works but was dropped from cabinet soon afterwards because it was alleged by the opposition that he was an agent of the Canadian Pacific Railway. Wells was defeated when he ran for reelection in 1907. In 1907, he bought the Hume Hotel in Nelson from John Frederick Hume. Wells died in Vancouver at the age of 93.

The settlement of Wilmer was named after him.

References 

1839 births
1933 deaths
British Columbia Liberal Party MLAs